Lotus Mashups is a business mashups editor developed and distributed by IBM as part of the IBM Mashup Center system. Lotus Mashups is intended for use in professional environments, such as corporations and governments.

Features

Interface
Lotus Mashups is a self-contained web application, requiring no external software to develop mashup applications. Mashups uses the Dojo framework for Web 2.0 functionality.

Integration with Websphere Portal
Lotus Mashups has the ability to integrate portlets into mashup projects. This is accomplished either by importing a portlet from a connected Websphere Portal server, or by uploading a .WAR file.

Security
In an effort to thwart unauthorized access of sensitive data by externally created widgets, all widgets are self-contained and isolated, unable to pass code back and forth unless specifically enabled by the mashup author.

InfoSphere MashupHub
The data and administration counterpart of Lotus Mashups, InfoSphere MashupHub is utilized for the following tasks:
 Creating new widgets using data feeds
 Housing a catalog of user-created widgets
 Acting as catalyst for community collaboration

Consumer Use
Although Lotus Greenhouse allows users to use Lotus Mashups free of charge, purchase of IBM Mashup Center is required for private collaboration. Consequently, the consumer market would likely find Lotus Mashups to be cost-prohibitive.

See also
 Mashup (web application hybrid)

External links
 Lotus Mashups home page
 Lotus Greenhouse - a web site where the public can test-drive Lotus collaboration products free of charge (registration required).

References

Mashup (web application hybrid)
Rich web applications
IBM software